is a Japanese football player. He plays for Okinawa SV.

Career
Yukihide Gibo joined J3 League club FC Ryukyu in 2017.

Club statistics
Updated to 1 January 2020.

References

External links

1996 births
Living people
Okinawa International University alumni
Association football people from Okinawa Prefecture
Japanese footballers
J3 League players
Japan Football League players
FC Ryukyu players
Tegevajaro Miyazaki players
Association football forwards